The 2019–20 Jacksonville State Gamecocks men's basketball team represented Jacksonville State University in the 2019–20 NCAA Division I men's basketball season. The Gamecocks, led by fourth-year head coach Ray Harper, played their home games at the Pete Mathews Coliseum in Jacksonville, Alabama as members of the Ohio Valley Conference. They finished the season 13–19, 8–10 in OVC play to finish in seventh place. They lost in the first round of the OVC tournament to Eastern Illinois.

Previous season
The Gamecocks finished the 2018–19 season 24–9 overall, 15–3 in OVC play to finish in third place. In the OVC tournament, they defeated UT Martin in the quarterfinals before losing to Murray State in the semifinals.

Roster

Schedule and results

|-
!colspan=9 style=| Exhibition

|-
!colspan=12 style=| Non-conference regular season

|-
!colspan=9 style=| Ohio Valley regular season

|-
!colspan=12 style=| Ohio Valley Conference tournament
|-

|-

Source

References

Jacksonville State Gamecocks men's basketball seasons
Jacksonville State Gamecocks
Jacksonville State Gamecocks men's basketball
Jacksonville State Gamecocks men's basketball